Swan House may refer to:

 Swan House (Atlanta), listed on the NRHP in Georgia
 Swan House (Chelsea Embankment), a Grade II* listed house on the River Thames in Chelsea, central London, England
 George B. Swan House, Davenport, IA, listed on the NRHP in Iowa
 Henry Swan House, Arlington, MA, listed on the NRHP in Massachusetts
 Asie Swan House, Methuen, MA, listed on the NRHP in Massachusetts
 Edward H. Swan House, Oyster Bay, NY, listed on the NRHP in New York
 Swan House and Vita Spring Pavilion, Beaver Dam, WI, listed on the NRHP in Wisconsin